Murray Asher Franklin (April 1, 1914 – March 16, 1978) was a Major League Baseball shortstop who played for the Detroit Tigers in  and .

Biography
He was born in Chicago, Illinois, and was Jewish. He attended Schurz High School in Chicago, and the University of Illinois at Urbana-Champaign in Champaign, Illinois.

In the minor leagues, in 1938 he led the Mountain State League in batting (.439), triples (13; tied), home runs (26), and slugging percentage (.790).  Franklin made his Major League debut on August 12, 1941 and played briefly for the rest of the season, before playing 48 games in 1942. He did not play after that, and finished his short career with 43 hits, 2 home runs, 16 RBIs and a .262 batting average.

References

External links

1914 births
1978 deaths
Baseball players from Chicago
Burials at Hillside Memorial Park Cemetery
Detroit Tigers players
Illinois Fighting Illini baseball players
Jewish American baseball players
Jewish Major League Baseball players
Major League Baseball shortstops
Carl Schurz High School alumni
20th-century American Jews